Idles (stylized as IDLES) are a British rock band formed in Bristol in 2009. The band consists of Joe Talbot (vocals), Mark Bowen (guitar), Lee Kiernan (guitar), Adam Devonshire (bass) and Jon Beavis (drums). Their debut album, Brutalism, was released in 2017 to critical acclaim, as was their second album Joy as an Act of Resistance in 2018. Their third album, Ultra Mono, was released in 2020, followed by Crawler in 2021.

History

Formation, Welcome and Meat/Meta EPs (2009–2015)

Welsh frontman Joe Talbot was born in Newport and spent his late teenage years in Devon. Talbot and bassist Adam Devonshire met in sixth form college in Exeter. Talbot and Devonshire then both moved to Bristol where they studied at the St Matthias Campus of the University of the West of England and decided to start a band. According to Talbot, "It took us a long time to get productive because we didn't know what the fuck we were doing at all, we were fucking terrible for a long time." Talbot and Devonshire went on to open the Bat-Cave Night Club in Bristol. Guitarist Mark Bowen moved from Belfast to study in Bristol and met Talbot while on the DJ circuit.

The band's first release was the Welcome EP in 2012. By 2014 the band comprised Talbot, Devonshire, guitarists Mark Bowen and Lee Kiernan, and drummer Jon Beavis. They released a second EP, Meat, which saw them embrace a much harder-edged direction from their early work, and Meta, an EP of remixes, in 2015, and then started writing songs for their debut album.

Brutalism (2016–2017)

After the 2016 singles, "Well Done" and "Divide & Conquer", the band released their first album, Brutalism, in March 2017 to critical acclaim. DIY gave it 4 stars, calling it "An exhilarating escape along frenzied rhythms and powerhouse rhythms with a ferocious commentary for guidance...as vital as it is volatile." The Line of Best Fit website gave it 9/10, calling Idles "one of the most exciting British bands right now". It received an 8/10 from PopMatters, with Ian King calling it "bracing, caustic, and relentless". Uncut gave it a similarly positive review, calling it "A rare rock record with the rage, urgency, wit and shattering of complacency usually found in grime." Talbot's mother died after a long illness while the band was working on the album, and is pictured on the cover, along with a sculpture by Talbot and his father. Her death gave Talbot and the band a new focus. They toured to support Brutalism, and supported the Maccabees on the London shows of their farewell tour, as well as supporting the Foo Fighters for the O2 Arena's 10th Birthday.

Joy as an Act of Resistance (2018–2019)

After several festival appearances throughout Europe, they began working on their second album, Joy as an Act of Resistance, which was released on 31 August 2018. Accompanying the release of Joy, the group created an exhibition in collaboration with HM Electric Gallery in London, taking place 30 and 31 August 2018.

In 2019, the band was nominated for Best Breakthrough Act at the 2019 Brit Awards and later won the 2019 Kerrang! Award for Best British Breakthrough Act. That same year, Joy as an Act of Resistance was shortlisted for the 2019 Hyundai Mercury Prize. The band performed "Never Fight a Man with a Perm" at the ceremony on 19 September. In December, they played various shows across the UK, including a packed concert of 10,000 at London's Alexandra Palace.

Ultra Mono (2020–2021)

During the latter stages of their Joy as an Act of Resistance tour in December 2019, Idles performed three new songs which were confirmed to be from their then-unannounced third album, which Talbot confirmed was finished and being mixed in an interview with Zane Lowe that same month.

Following the promotional single "Mr. Motivator" in May 2020, Talbot announced their third album, Ultra Mono, in June, on Steve Lamacq's Radio 6 show. The album was supported by a further four singles; "Grounds", "A Hymn", "Model Village" and "War" in June, July, August and September 2020, respectively. The record also features guest appearances from Jehnny Beth, Warren Ellis, David Yow and Jamie Cullum. In 2020, Idles received two nominations at the Berlin Music Video Awards: the music video "Never Fight a Man With a Perm" received a nomination for Best Animation and "Mercedes Marxist" was nominated for Best Concept.

Ultra Mono was released through Partisan Records on 25 September 2020 to predominantly positive reviews, with Louder Than War awarding it a 10 out of 10 and describing it as "the album of their career". The band followed the release of the album with a remix of "Model Village", featuring Slowthai. 

In 2021 the band received the Best Punk Record award for the album at the American Association of Independent Music’s (A2IM) Libera Awards. Also in 2021, the band released three covers: Sharon Van Etten's "Peace Signs" (for Van Etten's commemorative Epic Ten album), Gang of Four's "Damaged Goods" (for the Andy Gill tribute album The Problem Of Leisure) and Metallica's "The God That Failed" (for the charity tribute album The Metallica Blacklist).

Crawler (2021–present)

On 28 September 2021, shortly over a year after the release of Ultra Mono, the band released the single "The Beachland Ballroom". Coinciding with the announcement the band announced the release of their fourth studio album, Crawler, to be released later in the autumn. Prior to the album's release, the second single, for "Car Crash" was released. The song was written about Talbot's real-life car accident.

Crawler was released on 12 November 2021 through Partisan Records, and was met with critical acclaim. Matt Mitchell, writing for Paste, gave the album an 8.8 out of 10 saying that Crawler "is magnetic storytelling tempered with newfound patience". Damien Morris, of The Observer, called Crawler a "thrilling, glass-gargling introspection", giving the album a full five out of five stars. Stuart Berman of Pitchfork gave Crawler a 7 out 10, the highest rating the band has received from the website. Berman said that "the Bristol band’s fourth album plays like the dark origin story for how Idles became the preeminent life coaches of modern post-punk."

After being unable to tour for Ultra Mono due to the COVID-19 pandemic, the two albums were promoted in a worldwide tour from late 2021 to late 2022. During the tour, the band released two music videos from Crawler. The first, "When the Lights Come On" premiered on 13 December 2021 with direction from the company, Holding Hands with Horses. On 8 February 2022, the music video for "Crawl!" was released. The video was a claymation video directed by LOOSE and Edie Lawrence.

In April 2022, the band performed at Coachella Music and Arts Festival, with Desert Sun describing their performance as "rambunctious" and "chaotic".

Musical style

Idles' music has been associated with punk rock and related genres including post-punk, hardcore punk, and post-hardcore. Talbot rejected the punk label; in 2017, he said: "We're not a post punk band. I guess we have that motorik, engine-like drive in the rhythm section that some post punk bands have but we have plenty of songs that aren't like that at all." At a 2018 concert in Manchester, he said: "For the last time, we're not a fucking punk band."

Members
Current
 Joe Talbot – lead vocals (2009–present)
 Adam Devonshire – bass, backing vocals (2009–present)
 Mark Bowen – lead guitar, backing vocals (2009–present), electronics, keyboards (2021–present)
 Jon Beavis – drums, backing vocals (2011–present)
 Lee Kiernan – rhythm guitar, backing vocals (2015–present)

Former
 Andy Stewart – rhythm guitar, backing vocals (2009–2015)
 Jon Harper – drums (2009–2011)

Discography

 Brutalism (2017)
 Joy as an Act of Resistance (2018)
 Ultra Mono (2020)
 Crawler (2021)

Awards and nominations

References

External links
 

2009 establishments in England
British hardcore punk groups
English post-punk music groups
English punk rock groups
Musical groups established in 2009
Musical groups from Bristol
Musical quintets
Partisan Records artists